Mongoose is a JavaScript object-oriented programming library that creates a connection between MongoDB and the Node.js JavaScript runtime environment.

References

Free software programmed in JavaScript
JavaScript